Elit may refer to:

 Elit İşcan (born 1994), Turkish actress
 Elit (company), Turkish chocolate manufacturer
 Elit, Eritrea
 Elit, Iran
 Elit, Shimron (born 1978), Israeli musician